Rogier Dorsman (born 28 July 1999) is a Dutch Paralympic swimmer. He represented the Netherlands at the 2020 Summer Paralympics.

Career
Dorsman won gold medals at the 2019 World Para Swimming Championships in the Men's 200m Individual Medley and Men's 400m Freestyle

Dorsman represented the Netherlands at the 2020 Summer Paralympics and won gold medals in the men's 400 metre freestyle S11, men's 200 metre individual medley SM11 and men's 100 metre breaststroke SB11. He was also the flag bearer for the Netherlands during the closing ceremony of the 2020 Summer Paralympics.

References

External links
 Dorsman's personal website

1999 births
Living people
Dutch male backstroke swimmers
Dutch male breaststroke swimmers
Dutch male freestyle swimmers
Dutch male medley swimmers
Paralympic swimmers of the Netherlands
Medalists at the World Para Swimming Championships
Medalists at the World Para Swimming European Championships
Swimmers at the 2020 Summer Paralympics
Medalists at the 2020 Summer Paralympics
Paralympic gold medalists for the Netherlands
Paralympic medalists in swimming
S11-classified Paralympic swimmers
21st-century Dutch people